Vrancea is a county (județ) in Romania, with its seat at Focșani. It is mostly in the historical region of Moldavia but the southern part, below the Milcov River, is in Muntenia.

Demographics 

 Romanians – over 98%
 Romani, others –  2%

Geography

To the East, the heights decrease into hilly areas and the lower valley of the Siret River.

The main tributary of the Siret, which crosses the county, is the Putna River.

Seismic hazard

The earthquakes with the epicenter in Vrancea are caused by the movements of the nearby fault blocks. Devastating earthquakes measuring 7 to 8 on the Richter scale have been recorded.

The deadliest were the 1977 Vrancea earthquake, which killed over 1,500 people in Romania and Bulgaria, and the 1940 Vrancea earthquake which killed over 1,000 people. The most powerful was the 1802 Vrancea earthquake with an estimated intensity of 7.9 on the moment magnitude scale, but which killed only 4 people. Other notable earthquakes were the 1738 Vrancea earthquake, the 1838 Vrancea earthquake and the 1986 Vrancea earthquake.

Neighbours

Vaslui County and Galați County to the East.
Covasna County to the West.
Bacău County to the North.
Buzău County to the South and Brăila County to the South-East.

Economy

The county is famous for its wines, being the biggest wine producer in Romania. Over 11% of the county surface is covered with vines. The county's best known wine regions are Panciu – , Odobești – , and Cotești.

In addition, the county's main industries are the following:

 Foods and beverages;
 Textiles;
 Paper manufacturing and furniture making;
 Mechanical parts and components;
 Cookware and bakeware production.

Tourism

County's main destinations:

 The city of Focșani;
 Vrancea Mountains;
 Soveja resort;
 Tulnici – Lepșa – Greșu tourist areas;
 Eternal Fire (Focul viu in Romanian) in Andreiașu;
 Wine tasting and sales around Panciu, Odobești, and Cotești;
 The Mausoleum at Mărășești;
 Putna-Vrancea Natural Park.

Politics 
The Vrancea County Council, renewed at the 2020 local elections, consists of 32 counsellors, with the following party composition:

Administrative divisions

Vrancea County has 2 municipalities, 3 towns and 68 communes
Municipalities
Adjud
Focșani - county seat; population: 73,868 (as of 2011)
Towns
Mărășești
Odobești
Panciu

Communes
Andreiașu de Jos
Bălești
Bârsești
Biliești
Boghești
Bolotești
Bordești
Broșteni
Câmpineanca
Câmpuri
Cârligele
Chiojdeni
Ciorăști
Corbița
Cotești
Dumbrăveni
Dumitrești
Fitionești
Garoafa
Golești
Gologanu
Gugești
Gura Caliței
Homocea
Jariștea
Jitia
Măicănești
Mera
Milcovul
Movilița
Nănești
Năruja
Negrilești
Nereju
Nistorești
Obrejița
Paltin
Păulești
Păunești
Ploscuțeni
Poiana Cristei
Popești
Pufești
Răcoasa
Răstoaca
Reghiu
Ruginești
Sihlea
Slobozia Bradului
Slobozia Ciorăști
Soveja
Spulber
Străoane
Suraia
Tâmboești
Tănăsoaia
Tătăranu
Tulnici
Țifești
Urechești
Valea Sării
Vânători
Vârteșcoiu
Vidra
Vintileasca
Vizantea-Livezi
Vrâncioaia
Vulturu

See also
 Battle of Mărășești

References

External links
 Portal of Vrancea County
 Vrancea.com.ro ~ Trecut, prezent și viitor / Past, present and future 
 www.carnivoremari.ro ~ Large carnivore protection in Vrancea county
 www.carnivoremari.ro/rezervatii ~ Protected areas from the Vrancea mountains
 Vrancea Online - Vrancea County's start page on the Internet

 
Counties of Romania
Muntenia
Geography of Western Moldavia
1968 establishments in Romania
States and territories established in 1968